A subprefect is a high government official in several countries, such as Brazil and France. 

In Brazil, a subprefect (subprefeito) is the highest official of a subprefecture, which is a subdivision of certain large municipalities (São Paulo, Rio de Janeiro). The subprefect serves under the municipality's prefect (prefeito). 

In France, a subprefect (sous-préfet) is the highest official of an arrondissement, which is a subdivision of a department. The subprefect is appointed by the President of France, and serves under the department's prefect (préfet).

References